Balua is a village in Bhojpur Ara district in the Indian state of Bihar.

Demographics
 India census, Balua had a population of 326 in 56 households. Males constitute 53.37% of the population and females 46.61%. Balua has an average literacy rate of 48.77%, lower than the national average of 74%: male literacy is 57.23%, and female literacy is 42.76%. In Balua, 18.4% of the population is under 6 years of age.

References

Villages in West Champaran district